Luiz Fernando Borges Romão, simply Romão (born 31 July 1989), is a Brazilian footballer who plays for Capivariano as a forward.

Career
Born in Jaú, Romão began his career on XV de Jaú, and went on to play for a host of clubs. In May 2013, he signed a contract with Série A outfit Portuguesa., and made his top flight debut on 25th, in a 0-1 defeat against Vasco, as a starter.

Notes

References

External links

Romão at ZeroZero

1989 births
Living people
Brazilian footballers
São Carlos Futebol Clube players
Ituano FC players
América Futebol Clube (MG) players
Guaratinguetá Futebol players
Associação Portuguesa de Desportos players
Campeonato Brasileiro Série A players
Campeonato Brasileiro Série B players
Capivariano Futebol Clube players
Association football forwards
People from Jaú